The  is a Japanese freight-only railway company in Nagoya, Aichi, shared by Japan Freight Railway Company, Nagoya Port Authority, and Nippon Express. The third sector company (in a sense in Japan) was founded in 1965. Its lines serve the industrial area of the Nagoya Port. They mainly transport limestones via Seinō Railway, chemical products, train cars of Nagoya Railroad, or car parts of Toyota Motor.

Lines
Tōkō Line (東港線) opened 1965
Kasadera — Tōkō: 3.8 km
Shōwamachi Line (昭和町線) opened 1965
Tōkō — Shōwamachi: 1.1 km
Shiomichō Line (汐見町線) opened 1930, transferred 1965 
Tōkō — Shiomichō: 3.0 km
Nankō Line (南港線) opened 1968
Tōkō — Chita: 11.3 km
Tōchiku Line (東築線) opened 1965
Tōkō — Meiden-Chikkō: 1.3 km

See also
List of railway companies in Japan

References
This article incorporates material from the corresponding article in the Japanese Wikipedia

External links 
 Official website
 Nagoya Rinkai Railway from Kazuhiko's travelog, unofficial fansite.

Railway companies of Japan
Rail transport in Aichi Prefecture
Companies based in Nagoya